Valdas Urbonas (born 29 November 1967) is a Lithuanian professional football manager and former player who currently is the manager of the Lithuanian national team.

Club career
Urbonas began his career at Mokslas Vilnius, before moving to Neris Vilnius in 1990. In 1991, Urbonas briefly played for Vienybė Ukmergė, before moving to Vilnius Makabi. In 1992, after a spell with Minija Kretinga, Urbonas joined Geležinis Vilkas. In 1993, Urbonas signed for Žalgiris, making 41 A Lyga appearances over the course of four years, scoring twice. In 1997, Urbonas joined Hungarian club Videoton. Urbonas made 51 NB I appearances in three seasons for the club, scoring five times. In 1999, Urbonas joined fellow Hungarian club Gázszer, before returning home in 2000, playing with hometown club Ekranas, before retiring.

International career
Urbonas made 14 appearances for Lithuania, including captaining and scoring for Lithuania on his debut in a 4–1 win against Estonia on 15 November 1991.

International goals
Scores and results list Lithuania's goal tally first.

Managerial career
In 2009, following roles as assistant manager of FK Vėtra and FBK Kaunas, Urbonas was appointed manager of Ekranas. At Ekranas, Urbonas guided the team to four successive A Lyga titles and two Lithuanian Football Cups. In 2014, Urbonas was appointed manager of Trakai. In 2017, Urbonas was named manager of Latvian club Spartaks Jūrmala. In the same year, Urbonas won the 2017 Latvian Higher League with the club. In 2018, Urbonas returned to Žalgiris, where he had formerly played. In February 2019, Urbonas was appointed manager of Lithuania. In 30 June was announced, that he quit with the job with national team.

Managerial Statistics

References

1967 births
Living people
Sportspeople from Panevėžys
Lithuanian footballers
Association football defenders
Lithuania international footballers
FK Minija Kretinga players
FK Žalgiris players
Fehérvár FC players
Gázszer FC footballers
FK Ekranas players
Lithuania national football team managers
FK Ekranas managers
FK Riteriai managers
FK Žalgiris managers
Expatriate football managers in Latvia
Lithuanian football managers
Lithuanian expatriate football managers
Lithuanian expatriate footballers
Lithuanian expatriate sportspeople in Hungary
Lithuanian expatriate sportspeople in Latvia
A Lyga players
Nemzeti Bajnokság I players
A Lyga managers